Chiwapa Creek is a stream in the U.S. state of Mississippi. It is a tributary to Town Creek.

Chiwapa Creek is a name derived from either the Choctaw language or Chickasaw language but scholars do not agree on its meaning. Variant names are "Chawappa Creek", "Chiwappa Creek", "Chowapa Creek", "Chowappa Creek", "Chowwappa Creek", and "Pontotoc Creek".

References

Rivers of Mississippi
Rivers of Lee County, Mississippi
Rivers of Monroe County, Mississippi
Rivers of Pontotoc County, Mississippi
Mississippi placenames of Native American origin